Joe Palooka in the Squared Circle is a 1950 American film in the Joe Palooka series.

References

External links

1950 films
American black-and-white films
Films based on American comics
Joe Palooka films